Kivi's Underworld is a hack-and-slash action role-playing game. It was developed by Soldak Entertainment and was released on November 4, 2008. In Kivi's Underworld you Explore the mysterious underworld as a mighty Warrior battling opponents toe to toe, rain down fire on your enemies with the dangerous Fire Mage, sneak disguised with stealth to confound your foes as a Scout, unleash the fury of the Berserker, or adventure with any of the other numerous playable characters. You leave the safety of the underground cities to rebuild the lost city of Defiance to defeat a growing dark elf threat before they destroy your homeland.

Overview 

Kivi's Underworld has a unique progression system that derives from other computer ARPGs of the time. The game has simple combat and it is focused on unlocking multiple characters that each play differently. After completing a level, the player earns points that can be used to upgrade stats that can affect all characters at once.

Reception 
Since its release, the game has generally been received warmly by reviewers and gamers, being labeled pretty much like DoP (Depths of Peril), with a more straight dungeon-hacking focus. One bonus that Kivi's Underworld has is multiplayer which was most likely created for the fans who wanted one in Depths of Peril.

Modding 
Soldak Entertainment has also released a modding SDK for Kivi's Underworld. There are only a few basic mods that have been made most of which translate the game into a different language.

https://www.gamesindustry.biz/articles/kivi-s-underworld-battling-warrior-game-available-now--and-there-s-a-demo-too

References

External links

2008 video games
Hack and slash games
Video games developed in the United States
Video games with isometric graphics
Action role-playing video games
Fantasy video games
MacOS games
Windows games